Oreopolus is a genus of flowering plants belonging to the family Rubiaceae.

Its native range is Temperate Southern America.

Species
Species:
 Oreopolus glacialis (Poepp.) Ricardi

References

Rubiaceae
Rubiaceae genera